Albert Paulsen (born Albert Paulson; 13 December 1925 in Guayaquil, Ecuador – 25 April 2004 in Los Angeles, California) was an Ecuadorian-American actor who appeared in many American television series beginning in the 1960s, playing characters primarily of European origin.  A life member of The Actors Studio, Paulsen won an Emmy Award in 1964 for the Bob Hope Presents the Chrysler Theatre presentation  One Day in the Life of Ivan Denisovich, an historical novel by Aleksandr Solzhenitsyn.
Mr. Paulsen was a graduate of the Neighborhood Playhouse School of the Theatre studying under Sanford Meisner. He died from natural causes at the age of 78.

Filmography

Film
 All Fall Down (1962) - Captain Ramirez
 The Manchurian Candidate (1962) - Zilkov
 The Three Sisters (1966) - Kulygin
 Gunn (1967) - Nick Fusco
 How to Steal the World (1968) - Dr. Kurt Erikson
 Che! (1969) - Capt. Vasquez
 Mrs. Pollifax-Spy (1971) - Perdido
 The Laughing Policeman (1973) - Henry Camerero
 The Next Man (1976) - Hamid
 The Gypsy Warriors (1978) - SS Colonel Schlager
 Eyewitness (1981) - Mr. Sokolow
 Dikiy veter (1986) - Maj. Ted Kegan

Television

 GE True (1962–1963) - Josef Gabchik / Vik
 Combat! (1962–1966) - Col. Bruener / Dorfmann / Gen. Von Strelitz / Carl Dorfmann
 The Untouchables (1962) - Max Zenner
 General Hospital (1963) - Gen. Gastineau (1988)
 The Gallant Men (1963) - General Kile
 77 Sunset Strip (1963) - Toller Vengrin / Rudolph Gerhardt
 The Man from U.N.C.L.E. (1964–1968) - Dr. Kurt Erikson / Major Vicek
 Twelve O'Clock High (1965) - Arn Borg / Col. Hans Dieter
 Mission: Impossible (1966–1970) - Albert Zembra / Eric Bergman / General Ernesto Neyron / Eric Stavak /  Joseph Baresh
 The F.B.I. (1966) - Nagry
 The Rat Patrol (1966–1968) Colonel Von Helbing / Major Von Brugge
 The Flying Nun (1968) - Pedro Alvarez
 The Name of the Game (1968) - Humberto Benitez
 Hawaii Five-O (1969–1980) - Adrian Cassell / Edmonds / Josef Sarpa / Charley Bombay
 The Silent Force (1970, episode "The Octopus")
 The High Chaparral (1971) - Eduardo Nervo
 A World Apart (1971) - Dr. Neil Stevens
 Search (1973) - Henri Danzig
 Carola (1973) - Col. Kroll
 Hawkins (1973) episode "Murder on the 13th Floor"
 The Missiles of October (1974, teleplay) - Ambassador Anatoly Dobrynin
 The Rockford Files (1974) "Profit and Loss (Part 2)" - Kurt
 The Odd Couple (1975) - Boris Kalnikov
 Kolchak: The Night Stalker (1975) - Dr. James Verhyden
 Doctors' Hospital (1975) - Janos Varga
 Kojak (1977) - Shelley Briscoe
 Wonder Woman (1978) - Crichton
 Columbo (1978) "The Conspirators" - Vincent Pauley
 Galactica 1980 (1980) - General Yodel
 Manimal (1983) - Russian Agent
 Knight Rider (1985) - Mr. C
 Airwolf (1985) - Shrankov
 Scarecrow and Mrs. King (1986) - Serge Krutiov

References

External links
 
 
 Albert Paulsen at the Internet Off-Broadway Database 
 Albert Paulsen (as Albert Paulson) at the Internet Off-Broadway Database
 Obituaries For Your Eyes Only: Albert Paulsen

1925 births
2004 deaths
20th-century American male actors
American male film actors
American male television actors
Ecuadorian emigrants to the United States
Neighborhood Playhouse School of the Theatre alumni
Outstanding Performance by a Supporting Actor in a Drama Series Primetime Emmy Award winners
People from Greater Los Angeles
People from Guayaquil
Burials at Calverton National Cemetery